Peter Ulrik Magnus Hount (1769 –  17 July 1815) was a Norwegian priest and representative at the Norwegian Constitutional Assembly.

Peter Ulrik Magnus Hount was born at Nørre Sønderborg on the island of Als in  the Region of Southern Denmark. In his youth, his family moved to Søgne  in Vest-Agder, Norway.

He attended Kristiansand Cathedral School. He began his studies at the University of Copenhagen in 1786. He became in 1793 assistant pastor at Voss in Hordaland. In 1800 he became vicar of Moss in Østfold, and later became provost at Nedre Borgesyssel deanery (Nedre Borgesyssel prosti) in the Diocese of Borg.

Together with John Hansen Sørbrøden, he represented Smaalenenes amt (now Østfold) at the Norwegian Constituent Assembly at Eidsvoll in 1814 where they both voted with the independence party (Selvstendighetspartiet). He was a member of the Parliament of Norway for the period 1815–1816. He was decorated Knight of the Swedish Order of the Polar Star in 1815.

References

1769 births
1815 deaths
Norwegian Lutherans
University of Copenhagen alumni
Norwegian priest-politicians
Fathers of the Constitution of Norway
Order of the Polar Star